The white-streaked friarbird (Melitograis gilolensis) is a species of bird in the family Meliphagidae. It is monotypic within the genus Melitograis. It is endemic to Northern Maluku in Indonesia. Its natural habitats are subtropical or tropical moist lowland forests, subtropical or tropical mangrove forests, and subtropical or tropical moist montane forests.

References

white-streaked friarbird
Birds of the Maluku Islands
white-streaked friarbird
white-streaked friarbird
Taxonomy articles created by Polbot